Delta County Airport  is a county-owned public-use airport located  southwest of the central business district of Escanaba, a city in Delta County, Michigan, United States. It offers limited commercial service, which is subsidized by the Essential Air Service program.

It is included in the Federal Aviation Administration (FAA) National Plan of Integrated Airport Systems for 2021–2025, in which it is categorized as a non-hub primary commercial service facility.

The airport received $1 million from the US Department of Transportation in 2020 as part of the CARES Act to help mitigate the effects of the covid-19 pandemic.

Facilities and Aircraft

For the 12-month period ending December 31, 2021, the airport had 38,986 aircraft operations, an average of 107 per day: 77% general aviation, 19% air taxi, 3% scheduled commercial and less than 1% military. For the same period, there were 33 aircraft based at this airport: 31 single-engine, 1 multi-engine and 1 ultra-light.

The airport operates an FBO for general aviation use offering fuel, general maintenance, aircraft parking, courtesy and rental cars, a crew lounge, and more.

A Republic F-84F is on display at the entrance.

Airlines and destinations

Passenger

SkyWest Airlines operates flights on behalf of Delta Air Lines in Escanaba. The airport sees daily services both  to Detroit and Minneapolis. The airline created controversy when, citing staffing shortages, it operated flights to Detroit as a "tag flight" with a stop in Pellston. These services only lasted a month, and the airline returned to nonstop flights. However, another change was announced for December 2022, when the airline announced plans to operate tag flights between Escanaba and Iron Mountain en route to one of their hubs.

Statistics

Cargo

Accidents & Incidents
On November 3, 2015, a Glimn Kitfox 2-3 impacted terrain while attempting a forced landing at  Delta County. The aircraft's propeller had stopped rotating inflight, but the engine was still producing power enough to remain in the air. The probable cause of the accident was found to be the aircraft owner's inadequate maintenance and servicing of the propeller gearbox, resulting in oil starvation, gearbox failure, and a subsequent loss of propeller thrust. A contributing failure was the aircraft's low altitude, which made it impossible to reach the runway in time. The private pilot in control, a prospective buyer of the aircraft, received minor injuries.
On August 2, 2018, a Gerald Dan Coppock homebuilt experimental aircraft substained substantial damage during a runway  excursion following loss of directional control while landing at Escanaba. The pilot, who was uninjured, reported the aircraft veered left once the tailwheel contacted the runway; both wingtips subsequently contacted the runway surface, and the airplane ground-looped. The right steering cable chain was later found to be broken and hanging out of the tailwheel, but it is undetermined whether the cable break occurred prior to or during the accident sequence.

References

Other sources

 Essential Air Service documents (Docket OST-2003-15128) from the U.S. Department of Transportation:
 Order 2004-4-3: selecting Skyway Airlines, Inc., d/b/a Midwest Connect, to provide subsidized essential air service at Escanaba, Michigan, at an annual subsidy rate of $290,952 for the period of August 5, 2003, through March 31, 2006.
 Order 2006-6-23: re-selecting Skyway Airlines, Inc., d/b/a Midwest Connect, to provide subsidized essential air service (EAS) at Escanaba, Michigan, at an annual subsidy rate of $908,903 for the period April 1, 2006, through May 31, 2007.
 Order 2007-3-21: selecting Great Lakes Aviation, Ltd. to provide subsidized essential air service at Iron Mountain/Kingsford, Michigan, Ironwood, Michigan/Ashland, Wisconsin, Manistee/Lundington, Michigan, and Escanaba, Michigan for the two-year period beginning when the carrier inaugurates full service. The annual subsidy rates will be set at: $797,885 for Iron Mountain/Kingsford, $799,779 for Ironwood/Ashland, $957,978 for Manistee/Ludington, and $617,415 for Escanaba.
 Order 2008-1-13: selecting Mesaba Aviation, Inc., d/b/a Mesaba Airlines, operating as Northwest Airlink, utilizing 34-seat Saab 340 aircraft to provide subsidized EAS at Iron Mountain/Kingsford and Escanaba Michigan, at a combined annual subsidy rate of $2,251,767.
 Order 2008-8-14: re-selecting Mesaba Aviation, Inc., d/b/a Mesaba Airlines, operating as Northwest Airlink, utilizing 34-seat Saab 340 aircraft to provide subsidized EAS at Iron Mountain/Kingsford and Escanaba Michigan, at a combined annual subsidy rate of $2,870,236, for a new two-year period, beginning August 15, 2008.
 Order 2010-6-4: re-selecting Mesaba Aviation, Inc., d/b/a Mesaba Airlines, doing business as Delta Connection, utilizing 34-seat Saab 340 aircraft to provide subsidized essential air service (EAS) at Iron Mountain/Kingsford and Escanaba, Michigan, for a new two-year period, at a combined annual subsidy rate of $4,181,068.
 Order 2012-4-10: selecting Delta Air Lines, Inc., to provide essential air service (EAS) at Chisholm/Hibbing, Minnesota, and Escanaba, Pellston, and Sault Ste. Marie, Michigan, for $2,517,770, $2,833,558, $1,055,361, and $1,676,136, respectively. At Pellston, the service is to consist of 12 nonstop round trips per week to Detroit in the off-peak, and 14 per week in the peak period. At Sault Ste. Marie, the service will be 13 round trips per week year round. At the remaining two communities, service is to consist of 12 nonstop round trips per week year round. All service is to be operated with 50-seat CRJ-200 aircraft.

External links

 http://flyesc.com/
   at Michigan Airport Directory
 Aerial image as of April 1999 from USGS The National Map
 

Airports in Michigan
Essential Air Service
Buildings and structures in Delta County, Michigan
Transportation in Delta County, Michigan
Airports in the Upper Peninsula of Michigan